The Arab Evangelical Church of São Paulo was established in 1935, by a Lebanese pastor in Sao Paulo. He set a preaching point in Goias. It dedicated its own church building in 1979. It had in 2004 1 parish with 3 preaching points.
It is a member of the World Communion of Reformed Churches.

References 

Members of the World Communion of Reformed Churches
Reformed denominations in South America